is a Japanese-Taiwanese actor and singer. Beginning his career as a pop idol, he has since moved his focus towards the film industry, where he achieved both commercial success and critical acclaim. He has worked with directors throughout East Asia, including Wong Kar-wai (Chungking Express and Fallen Angels), Peter Chan (Perhaps Love, The Warlords, and Wuxia), Zhang Yimou (House of Flying Daggers) and John Woo (Red Cliff and The Crossing I and II). Kaneshiro is also well known in the gaming industry for being the model and voice for the samurai character, Samanosuke Akechi, in Capcom’s Onimusha video game series.

Early life
Kaneshiro was born in Taipei, Taiwan. His mother is from Taiwan and his father is from Okinawa, Japan. He was born and raised in Taipei, but holds Japanese citizenship.

The son of a Japanese businessman and a Taiwanese homemaker, Kaneshiro has two elder half-brothers: one who is seven years his senior, and another who is just one year older. After graduating from Taipei Japanese Junior High School, he enrolled at an English-medium international school, Taipei American School, where he learned English. During his time at secondary school, Kaneshiro  began working in television commercials, and he decided to leave school to pursue a full-time career in music and acting. Kaneshiro is multilingual, fluent in Mandarin, Hokkien, Japanese, and to lesser degrees in Cantonese and English.  Mandarin was the first language he spoke while growing up in Taiwan.

Name
 is a common Okinawan surname, albeit with an unusual pronunciation, as the usual reading is Kinjō, while the traditional Okinawan pronunciation is Kanagusuku or Kanegusuku.

Since personal names are commonly written in Chinese characters in both Chinese and Japanese naming conventions, following the Eastern name order, and in this particular case the name, in its written form, appears native in both Japanese and Chinese, giving Kaneshiro the freedom to associate himself as a Japanese or Chinese when working in China by preserving or removing the space between his surname and given name.

Career

1992 to 1999: Early years and career breakthrough 
In 1992, Kaneshiro  made his singing debut, entering the business with the nickname "Aniki", meaning 'older brother' in Japanese. His debut album was Heartbreaking Night (1992). Contracted to EMI, he wrote many of his own Mandarin and Cantonese songs. The following year, his popularity propelled him into acting. He no longer produces any commercial music, although a few noted film roles, such as those in Perhaps Love (如果。愛) (2005) and See You Tomorrow (擺渡人)(2016) have involved his characters singing.

Kaneshiro made his film debut in Executioners (1993) and this was followed by Wong Kar-wai's Chungking Express (1994), Fallen Angels (1995) and a string of other Hong Kong films, such as Lost and Found (1996), and Anna Magdalena (1998).  It was through his collaboration with the auteur director Wong Kar Wai in Chungking Express that Kaneshiro first developed what would become his onscreen signature, namely quirky, character-driven performances that often played against type and ran counter to his idol image. Later, Kaneshiro starred in the Japanese Drama God, Please Give Me More Time (1998), allowing him to branch into Japanese films such as Returner (2002), as well as K-20: Legend of the Mask (2009) and Accuracy of Death (also titled “Sweet Rain”), (2010).

2000 to 2010: Mainstream success 

Kaneshiro’s work, however, is more heavily concentrated in China, Hong Kong, and Taiwan. In 2005, he sang his way through Perhaps Love, the first modern musical to be produced in China. It was the first of many collaborations with Hong Kong-based director Peter Chan. In 2008 and 2009 he starred in Red Cliff, a high budget film by Hong Kong director John Woo. He has also played the romantic lead in Zhang Yimou's House of Flying Daggers, and starred alongside Jet Li and Andy Lau in The Warlords. He expressed excitement when he received the news that he would have an opportunity to work with Director Zhang Yimou.

Kaneshiro has also become well known in the video game industry portraying the samurai warrior Samanosuke in Capcom's Onimusha. In a June 2007 article on the film site Ain't It Cool News, it was revealed that Kaneshiro was going to be in the Onimusha film, reprising his role as Samanosuke and for a 2011 release, but that project was derailed. The producer Samuel Hadida had to delay the filming of Onimusha, which has resulted in the film's Japanese cast working on other film projects during the delay, and being unavailable to start filming. These factors were enough that French director Christophe Gans will now direct an adaptation of Leo Perutz's novel The Swedish Cavalier first, taking over the reins from Gilles Mimouni. Satomi Ishihara and Tsuyoshi Ihara remain attached to the project.

In 2003, Kaneshiro was featured in Time magazine and was dubbed the Johnny Depp of the East Asian film industry. Moreover, Kaneshiro was interviewed by Australian journalist Hugh Riminton for CNN in the network’s TalkAsia segment in 2006.

2011 to present: Selective films 
In 2011, Kaneshiro appeared in the historical martial arts thriller Dragon, directed by Peter Chan. The film premiered at the 2011 Cannes Film Festival in the Midnight Screenings category.

In 2017, Kaneshiro was the winner of the Best Leading Actor award at the second annual Golden Screen Awards. He won for his starring role in the romantic comedy This Is Not What I Expected, which was directed by Derek Hui and produced by Peter Chan.

Kaneshiro became a member of the Academy of Motion Picture Arts and Sciences in 2018. In that same year, he completed filming for Juno Mak's Sons of the Neon Night, with an ensemble cast that includes Tony Leung Ka Fai, Louis Koo, and Sean Lau. It was reported in 2020 that the release of this film will be postponed to 2021. The reasons given involved production issues, including budgeting and tensions between the director and cast. Kaneshiro will act as the spokesperson for the new Paradise 2M mobile multiplayer game launched in March 2021.

Personal life
Kaneshiro is a practicing Buddhist, having converted in 1997, and has said his mother is also a devout Buddhist. Throughout his career, Kaneshiro has been given titles such as "heartthrob," "dream guy," but he has maintained a steady sense of humility. Kaneshiro is also known for trying to avoid the media spotlight. He has been quoted as saying "If one day I get married and have kids, I will probably be one of those men who really care for the family. I will eat at home every day, and help with the house work and take care of the children."

Filmography

Film

Television

Video games

Discography

Studio albums

Soundtrack

Awards and nominations
Takeshi Kaneshiro is one of 10 recipients of the 2010 Green Planet Film Award for Ten Best International Actors of the Decade (Asia).

See also
 Takeshi Kaneshiro Tree

References

External links

1973 births
Living people
Japanese people of Taiwanese descent
Male actors from Taipei
Taiwanese male television actors
Taiwanese male film actors
Tibetan Buddhists from Taiwan
Japanese male voice actors
Japanese male television actors
Japanese male film actors
Tibetan Buddhists from Japan
Musicians from Taipei
Baritones
Japanese baritones
Taiwanese male singers
Mandarin-language singers of Japan
Cantonese-language singers of Taiwan
Taiwanese people of Okinawan descent
20th-century Japanese male actors
21st-century Japanese male actors
20th-century Taiwanese male actors
21st-century Taiwanese male actors
Taiwanese idols
Japanese idols
21st-century Japanese singers
21st-century Taiwanese singers
21st-century Japanese male singers